George Leslie Brown (July 1, 1926 – March 31, 2006) was an American politician. He served in the Colorado Senate from 1955 to 1974 and as the 40th Lieutenant Governor of Colorado from 1975 to 1979. He was also a senior vice president with Grumman Corporation. During World War II, he served as a Tuskegee Airman. Together with California's Mervyn Dymally, he was one of the first two Black lieutenant-governors since Reconstruction and outside any southern state.

Early life
Growing up on a farm in Kansas, Brown was a star athlete in basketball, football and track before graduating from Lawrence Liberty Memorial High School in 1944.  Brown graduated from the University of Kansas in 1950 with a B.S. in journalism. He also did graduate work at Harvard Business School, the University of Colorado and the University of Denver.

Career
For fourteen years, he worked as a writer and editor for The Denver Post and hosted his own Denver radio talk show. He was the first African American editor to work for a major daily newspaper in the Rocky Mountain region. Brown served as the assistant executive director for Denver's Public Housing Program for four years and taught at the University of Colorado and the University of Denver.

In 1956, Brown made history when he was elected to the Colorado State Senate. He served as a state senator for eighteen years, and was re-elected to five consecutive four-year terms. Then, in 1974, in the middle of his fifth Senate term, he was elected Lieutenant Governor of Colorado, a position he held for four years. Brown and California's Mervyn Dymally became the first two Black lieutenant-governors since Reconstruction and outside any southern state. In addition, Brown won the statewide primary election to get a seat on the gubernatorial democratic ticket; whereas Dymally was elected independently separately.

Brown's tenure was marred by controversy: in 1975 he claimed that in 1943, during his military training, he was in an airplane crash and the Alabama farmer whose field he crashed into chained him up and branded him with a "K" for the Ku Klux Klan. The brand later turned out to be from his college fraternity, Kappa Alpha Psi. Later, he said that the incident had happened to another cadet and he apologized for misleading people. Later in 1975, he was the subject of a grand jury investigation into travel expenses of around $3,600 he had billed the state. He said it was a clerical error and no charges were filed. In 1978, when Governor Richard Lamm was in Florida on holiday and Brown was acting as governor, he pardoned recently paroled former death row inmate Sylvester Lee Garrison, because Brown felt Garrison never received a fair trial, with an all-white jury and judge. When Lamm returned, he rescinded the pardon. Brown found serving as lieutenant governor "very frustrating", and he did not run for re-election in 1978. He was replaced on Lamm's ticket by Nancy E. Dick, and the two won the election.

Later in 1978, Lamm accused Brown of overspending his departmental budget by $10,000 and ordered the State Comptroller to withhold his final $2,083 paycheck. His supporters picketed Lamm and Dick's inauguration and in 1980 he sued Lamm for $500,000 for the withheld pay. The government settled, sending him a cheque for $10,000.

After his term as lieutenant governor had concluded, Brown never sought public office again. In 1979, Brown joined the Grumman Corporation as vice president for marketing and was later promoted to senior vice president in charge of the firm's regional offices, becoming the first African American corporate officer in a major U.S. aerospace company. He attended Harvard Business School's six-week Advanced Management Program in 1980, and worked as Grumman's chief lobbyist in Washington, D.C., until he left Grumman in 1990. That year, Brown joined the Washington, D.C. law firm of Whitten & Diamond. In March 1994, he was named director for Prudential Securities and managed its Washington public finance office. He was a banker for Greenwich Partners from 1997 to 2000.

Later life and death

Brown died on March 31, 2006, of cancer.

See also
 Executive Order 9981
 List of Tuskegee Airmen
 Military history of African Americans
 List of minority governors and lieutenant governors in the United States

References

1926 births
2006 deaths
Politicians from Lawrence, Kansas
Tuskegee Airmen
University of Kansas alumni
University of Colorado alumni
University of Denver alumni
American radio personalities
American newspaper editors
University of Colorado Boulder faculty
University of Denver faculty
Democratic Party members of the Colorado House of Representatives
Democratic Party Colorado state senators
Lieutenant Governors of Colorado
Deaths from cancer in Florida
African-American state legislators in Colorado
United States Army Air Forces pilots of World War II
United States Army Air Forces officers
20th-century American politicians
African-American aviators
Aviators from Colorado
21st-century African-American people
African-American men in politics